Mark McGuigan (born 7 November 1988) is a Scottish professional footballer, who plays as a forward for Scottish League Two side Stenhousemuir.

Career
McGuigan was given a chance by Partick Thistle manager Jackie McNamara after a closed-doors friendly between Partick Thistle and a Scottish Universities side. McGuigan scored for the Universities during the match, and was brought to Thistle on trial. He signed a deal with Thistle in March 2012. It took him until the next month to score his first goal, late on in a 3–1 win against Ayr United. He scored his only other Thistle goal against Falkirk on 28 April 2012, the penultimate game of the season.

McGuigan failed to earn a place in the Partick team at the start of the 2012–13 season, and had to be sent on loan to Second Division strugglers Albion Rovers in order to get game time. He was part of the side relegated to the bottom division, where he rejoined Rovers on loan the following season, until January, when he was released by Partick Thistle and was signed permanently by Albion Rovers.

In May 2015, Albion Rovers won the League Two title. Mere days later McGuigan left Rovers to sign for rival Scottish League One side Stranraer. McGuigan spent two years with Stranraer, before signing for Scottish League Two side Stenhousemuir on 16 May 2017.

References

External links

1988 births
Living people
Scottish footballers
Association football forwards
Celtic F.C. players
Blantyre Victoria F.C. players
St Andrews United F.C. players
Forfar Athletic F.C. players
Partick Thistle F.C. players
Scottish Football League players
Albion Rovers F.C. players
Stranraer F.C. players
Stenhousemuir F.C. players
Scottish Professional Football League players